Six ships of the English Navy or the Royal Navy have borne the name Encounter or HMS Encounter:

 was a discovery vessel in service in 1616.
 was a 12-gun gun-brig launched in 1805 and wrecked in 1812.
 was an early wooden screw corvette launched in 1846 and broken up in 1866.
 was an  wooden screw corvette launched in 1873 and sold in 1888.
HMS Encounter was a  protected cruiser launched in 1902. She was transferred to the Royal Australian Navy in 1919, renamed HMAS Penguin in 1923 while serving as a depot ship, and was scuttled in 1932.
 was an E-class destroyer launched in 1934 and sunk in 1942.

Royal Navy ship names